San Juan de Gredos is a municipality located in the province of Ávila, Castile and León, Spain. According to the 2011 census (INE), the municipality has a population of 338 inhabitants.

The municipality is formed of three independent hamlets: Navacepeda de Tormes, San Bartolomé de Tormes and La Herguijuela.

In the locality of Navacepeda de Tormes an ancient brown bear claw is found embedded at the church porch.

References

Municipalities in the Province of Ávila